Mikke Levo (born March 28, 1995) is a Finnish ice hockey defenceman. His is currently playing with Ilves in the Finnish Liiga.

Levo made his Liiga debut playing with Ilves during the 2013–14 Liiga season.

References

External links

1995 births
Living people
Finnish ice hockey defencemen
Ilves players
People from Orivesi
Sportspeople from Pirkanmaa